Savanta (formerly Savanta ComRes) is a market research consultancy based in London, England. Established in 2003 as Communicate Research Ltd, ComRes was a founding member of the British Polling Council in 2004, and is one of the UK's best known polling companies.

The company is prominent in the British media through its regular voting intention polls for ITV News, the Daily Mail, and for its surveys of legislators in Westminster and Brussels. Other media outlets such as The Independent, the BBC, and Sky News also commission Savanta ComRes research.

It has offices in Westminster, Brussels and Shanghai, and works with clients across business, government, and the voluntary sector.

The company rebranded as Savanta ComRes in 2019 when it was sold to Savanta for an undisclosed amount.

History

Founded by current Chairman Andrew Hawkins in 2003, ComRes originally focused on research in the political sphere. In 2010, it was named Pollster of the Year at the Public Affairs Awards.

In recent years, the business has expanded to develop expertise in a wider range of sectors, including financial services, education, healthcare, transport, and the voluntary sector.

It won the Market Research Society's Public Policy & Social Research Award in 2014, for its research on behalf of the Grantham Research Institute on Climate Change and the Environment.

Methodology

Savanta ComRes uses a range of methodologies to conduct quantitative and qualitative research. These include telephone, face-to-face, and online surveys, focus groups, consultations, and social media monitoring.

As a registered market research agency, Savanta ComRes is exempt from the UK's Telephone Preference Service, and can therefore conduct computer-assisted telephone interviewing (CATI) across the country. It continues to conduct its national voting intention surveys via this methodology.

The company also provides data analytics such as market segmentation, regression analysis, MaxDiff, and conjoint analysis.

Poll archive
The company makes freely available its political voting intention polls on its website along with results from regular surveys.

References

Market research companies of the United Kingdom
Companies based in the City of Westminster
Polling organisations in the United Kingdom